Ken Ashcroft is an Australian former rugby league footballer who played in the 1950s and 1960s. He played in Australia's major competition - the New South Wales Rugby League (NSWRL) premiership.

Ashcroft, a hooker, played 151 matches for Eastern Suburbs during the years (1957–67) his 11 seasons at the club. Ashcroft was a member of the Eastern Suburbs side that was beaten by the St George Dragons in the 1960 premiership decider.

Sources
 Whiticker, Alan & Hudson, Glen (2006) The Encyclopedia of Rugby League Players, Gavin Allen Publishing, Sydney

References

Living people
Australian rugby league players
Sydney Roosters players
Sydney Roosters captains
Rugby league players from Sydney
Year of birth missing (living people)
Place of birth missing (living people)